Thyrocopa abusa is a moth of the family Xyloryctidae. It was first described by Lord Walsingham in 1907. It is endemic to the Hawaiian islands of Kauai, Oahu, Molokai, Lanai, Maui and Hawaii. It is the type species of the genus Thyrocopa.

Adults are on wing year round. There is a high degree of variation in forewing pattern in this species.

The larvae feed on Acacia koa, Cyrtandra, Freycinetia, guava, Ipomoea, Lantana, Pipturus and Ricinus. The brownish larvae, protected by a silken web or tunnel, bore in the dead twigs of many plants. They also feed on the bark and may feed to some extent upon the living tissues. Larvae were also found in silken tunnels in and beneath dried cow dung.

External links

Thyrocopa
Endemic moths of Hawaii
Moths described in 1907